Muynak Airport is an airport located in the city of Muynak, Uzbekistan (Qoraqalpogiston Respublikasi region-in the north-west of Uzbekistan). It is considered as small type airport in terms of its capacity to transport passengers.

History 
The airfield "Muynak" as 3rd class airport, was able to take the An-24, Yak-40 and additional light aircraft, as well as helicopters and so on.

From the 1960s to the early 1990s, an An-2 aircraft link was based at the aerodrome; up to 19 passenger flights were made on local air lines (in particular, to Kungrad, Nukus, Urgench, Takhtakupyr, Kazakhdarya, Aspantay, Tuley) points.

Since the 1990s, it has been used as a landing platform for aerial work (in particular, for agrochemical measures to combat locust foci in the southern Aral Sea region).

See also 
 Tashkent International Airport
 Termez Airport
 Bukhara International Airport

References 

Airports in Uzbekistan